The M67 is a short metropolitan route in Johannesburg, South Africa.

Route 
The M67 begins at R41 and ends at the R114.

References 

Streets and roads of Johannesburg
Metropolitan routes in Johannesburg